Lequio Berria is a comune (municipality) in the Province of Cuneo in the Italian region Piedmont, located about  southeast of Turin and about  northeast of Cuneo.

Lequio Berria borders the following municipalities: Albaretto della Torre, Arguello, Benevello, Borgomale, Bosia, Cravanzana, and Rodello.

Demographic evolution

References

Cities and towns in Piedmont